ersguterjunge is an independent German hip hop label distributed by Sony BMG. It was founded by rappers D-Bo and Bushido in 2004, after he left the indie label Aggro Berlin. Bushido is the managing director. ersguterjunge is a reflexion on some of Germany's immigrant population's slang for standard German "er ist ein guter Junge" ("he is a good boy").

History
Bass Sultan Hengzt was signed in 2005, but left shortly after the release of his album Rap braucht immer noch kein Abitur. DJ Ilan and DJ Devin also left, due to personal issues, and were replaced by producers Chakuza and DJ Stickle, alias Beatlefield.

Two more artists were signed little later: Screwaholic now part of Anno Domini Nation, a producer, and Bizzy Montana, a rapper and producer.

Female rapper Bahar left the label, because in her opinion it did not provide the possibility of a successful album release.

Nyze, who had been on several ersguterjunge releases, was signed in December 2006 and his album Geben & Nehmen was released in January 2007. Eko Fresh also signed in the same month, and Saad renewed his contract to release another album.

In early 2007 Bushido started the girl group Bisou, which consists of former candidates of the German version of Popstars.
With Kay One and Tarééc, two more artists were signed.

In May 2010, released Kay One's debut album Kenneth allein zu Haus. The album reached Top 10 in the charts.

Artists

Current acts

Former acts

Current  producers 
Bushido

Releases

Singles

See also 
 List of record labels
 List of hip hop record labels

References

External links
 https://web.archive.org/web/20100528153241/http://www.ersguterjunge.de/
 http://www.KingofKingz.de
 https://web.archive.org/web/20100930183816/http://www.ersguterjunge.org/

Record labels established in 2004
German record labels
Hip hop record labels
Music in Berlin
Companies based in Berlin
Mass media in Berlin